Douglas Brunt (born August 25, 1971) is an American novelist and former president and CEO of the cybersecurity firm Authentium.

Early life
Born in Philadelphia, Pennsylvania, Brunt is the son of Jacklyn Bray Brunt and Manly Yates Brunt Jr. Before graduating from Duke University, he attended The Haverford School.

Career 
In 2001, he joined Authentium, Inc., an internet security firm, where he was president and CEO until 2011, when he sold the firm to Commtouch.

He wrote the novels Ghosts of Manhattan (2012), The Means (2014), and Trophy Son (2017).

Personal life 
On March 1, 2008, Brunt married television journalist Megyn Kelly in Huntington, New York. Kelly is a former anchor for Fox News and NBC News. They have three children: son Edward Yates, (born 2009); daughter Yardley Evans, (born 2011); and son Thatcher Bray, (born 2013). He currently resides in Rye, New York with Kelly and their children.

References

External links 
 

1971 births
Living people
American male novelists
Writers from Philadelphia
Businesspeople from Pennsylvania
Duke University alumni
American chief executives
Haverford School alumni
Novelists from Pennsylvania